Valsan Koorma Kolleri (born 1953) is an Indian sculptor.

Career
Born in Pattiam,  Kerala, Kolleri studied at the École nationale supérieure des Beaux-Arts, Paris (1985–86), the Faculty of Fine Art, Maharaja Sayajirao University of Baroda (1976–79) and the Government College of Fine Arts, Chennai (1971–76).

Solo Exhibitions

 2007 ‘New Clearage: Retrospective as Artwork’, Talwar Gallery, New York
 2005 ‘Retrospective as Artwork’, Colab Gallery, Bangalore
 2005 ‘Retrospective as Artwork’, B.Q. Gallery, Koln, Germany
 2004 ‘Drainage: Rain Harvesting Sculpture’, Khoj, Delhi
 2004 ‘Retrospective as Artwork’, Project Gallery, Dublin, Ireland
 2003 ‘Draw’, National Institute of Design, Ahmedabad
 1998 ‘Draw’, Art Inc. Gallery, Delhi
 1998 ‘Sculpture Show, Egmore Museum, Chennai, Alliance Francaise, Bangalore
 1998 ‘Sculpture Age’, Pundole Art Gallery, Mumbai
 1990 ‘Bronze Age’, Center for Contemporary Art, Delhi
 1989 ‘Stone Age and Bronze Age’, British Council Gallery, Chennai
 1986 ‘This Time Ceramics’, Sakshi Gallery, Chennai

External links 
 Indian sculptor Artists
 kochimuzirisbiennale
 Valsan Koorma Kolleri .Works.Profile.Interview
 Press Release -VALSAN KOORMA KOLLERI-NEWCLEARAGE: Retrospective as Artwork
 It’s A Fish…It’s A Crocodile…mumbaiboss.com review
 Design-for-India
 Kochi Muziris Biennale 2012
 
 
 
 
 
 
 

1953 births
Artists from Kerala
Living people
Maharaja Sayajirao University of Baroda alumni
20th-century Indian sculptors
People from Kannur district
Indian male sculptors
20th-century Indian male artists